Robert Adrian Băjan (born 30 October 1995) is a Romanian professional footballer who plays as a right back. In his career Băjan also played for FC Brașov, ASA 2013 Târgu Mureș, Pandurii Târgu Jiu, Rapid București or Farul Constanța.

Honours
Rapid București
Liga III: 2018–19

References

External links
 
 

1995 births
Living people
Sportspeople from Slatina, Romania
Romanian footballers
Association football defenders
Romania youth international footballers
Liga I players
Liga II players
FCV Farul Constanța players
FC Brașov (1936) players
ASA 2013 Târgu Mureș players
CS Pandurii Târgu Jiu players
FC Viitorul Constanța players
FC Rapid București players
FC Unirea Constanța players